Villeneuve-sur-Fère is a commune in the Aisne department in Hauts-de-France  in northern France.

Population

Personalities
The commune was the birthplace of Paul Claudel (1868–1955), poet and diplomat, and sculptor Camille Claudel (1864-1943).

See also
Communes of the Aisne department

References

Communes of Aisne
Aisne communes articles needing translation from French Wikipedia